Ghiselle is an opera by César Franck to a Merovingian-themed French libretto by the novelist Gilbert-Augustin Thierry, son of Amédée Thierry. The plot, set in the sixth century, while not keeping up with the "one assassination per act" of its predecessor Hulda (1886), is nonetheless rich in violent incident and ends with a double suicide.

Composition began in the fall of 1888 and the last page of the piano score bears the date 21 September 1889. Franck orchestrated the first act himself; the remainder were prepared for the posthumous premiere (in Monte Carlo) by his pupils Pierre de Bréville, Ernest Chausson, Vincent d'Indy, Samuel Rousseau and Arthur Coquard.

Roles

Sources
Léon Vallas: César Franck, translated by  Hubert Foss (London 1951)

External links

Operas
French-language operas
Operas by César Franck
1889 operas
Opera world premieres at the Opéra de Monte-Carlo
Operas completed by others